The Macedonian Chess Championship is organized by the Chess Federation of Macedonia. It was last held in 2011, although the Macedonian Open Chess Championship, which is also open to foreign players, continues to be organized annually.

Pre-independence history
Jovan Sofrevski won a record sixteen titles, and Risto Nicevski became the youngest winner at 20 years old when he won the 1966 championship; he won five titles in total.

National championship winners

{| class="sortable wikitable"
! Year !! Champion
|-
| 1992 || Zvonko Stanojoski
|- 
| 1993 || Vlatko Bogdanovski
|-
| 1994 || 
|- 
| 1995 ||Vlatko Bogdanovski
|-
| 1996 || Dragoljub Jacimović
|-
| 1997 ||Trajče Nedev
|- 
| 1998 ||Dragoljub Jacimovic
|-
| 1999 || 
|-
| 2000 ||Trajče Nedev
|-
| 2001 || 
|-
| 2002 || 
|-
| 2003 ||Zvonko Stanojoski
|-
| 2004 ||Nikola Vasovski
|-
| 2005 ||Zvonko Stanojoski
|-
| 2006 ||Zvonko Stanojoski
|-
| 2007 || Vladimir Georgiev
|-
| 2008 || 
|-
| 2009 ||Vlatko Bogdanovski
|-
| 2010 || 
|-
| 2011 ||Trajče Nedev
|}

Women's championship winners 

{| class="sortable wikitable"
! No. !! Year !! Champion
|-
| 1 || 2008 || Gabriela Koskoska
|-
| 2 || 2011 || Gabriela Koskoska
|}

References

External links
 Chess.com.mk

Chess national championships
Women's chess national championships
Chess in North Macedonia
Recurring sporting events established in 1946
1946 establishments in the Socialist Republic of Macedonia
1946 in chess
Chess